Sarina Range is a rural locality in the Mackay Region, Queensland, Australia. In the  Sarina Range had a population of 250 people.

History 
The name Sarina Range is probably derived from the Sarina Inlet, which in turn is believed to be named by surveyor William Charles Borlase Wilson, using a name from Greek mythology indicating enchantress.

East Funnel Creek Provisional School opened on 23 June 1941. In 1950 it became East Funnel Creek State School. It closed in 1963.

In the  Sarina Range had a population of 250 people.

Community groups 
The Nebo Sarina Range branch of the Queensland Country Women's Association meets at 1994 Marlborough Sarina Road.

References

Further reading 

 

Mackay Region
Localities in Queensland